Matijevići may refer to:

 Matijevići, Sisak-Moslavina County, a village near Dvor, Croatia
 Matijevići, Dubrovnik-Neretva County, a village near Kula Norinska
 Matijevići, Kladanj, a village near Kladanj

See also
 Matijević (disambiguation), singular form